Seascape is a residential skyscraper currently under construction in Auckland, New Zealand. When completed in 2024, it will be the tallest residential building in New Zealand, surpassing the  The Pacifica. It is set to cost NZ$300 million to complete.

Design 
Seascape is being developed by China-based development firm Shundi Group, with support from China Construction New Zealand. Australasia-based architect firm, Peddle Thorp designed the skyscraper. 

The project also includes the re-cladding, refurbishment and seismic strengthening of Ballantyne House, an existing 12-storey concrete office building on the eastern edge of the site into a boutique hotel and refurbishment of the historic Britomart Hotel on the western edge.

Seascape will contain five levels of basement carparks, accessed by a ramp and VIP car lifts from Gore Street Lane. A podium will occupy the bottom seven floors, including a two-storey lobby. There will be retail tenancies on the ground and first floors, with two levels of VIP parking and then two levels of offices above this. On the seventh floor, there will be a swimming pool, fitness room, changing facilities. On the 37th level, there will be a sky garden. 

48 of the 52 total floors will be occupiable. Of these, there will be four apartment types with sub-penthouses and Penthouses from the 41st level.

Six of 15 luxury penthouses have already been reserved by buyers, including the top level, two-storey penthouse, which had been on the market with an asking price of NZ$24 million. As of November 2022, half of the 221 apartments had been sold.

See also 

 List of tallest buildings in Oceania
 List of tallest buildings in Auckland
 List of tallest structures in New Zealand

References 

Skyscrapers in Auckland
2020 establishments in New Zealand
Auckland CBD